Khawnglung Run (English: The Massacre of Khawnglung or The Raid of Khawnglung) is a 2012 Mizo-language Action Romantic epic film directed by Mapuia Chawngthu based on true events of the historical massacre of Khawnglung during 1856–1859. The Khawnglung village raid was one of the most famous and the greatest massacre in Mizo history.

Cast
Alex Lalchhuankima as Chala
Zoremsangi Hnamte as Thangi
A.Zothanpuia
David C.Lalrinawma
Lalthakimi
F. Zomuankima
Lalnunmawia
Ms-i
R.Saptawna
K.Rodingliana
Joseph Lalnuntluanga
Rohluzuala
Lalropuii Pachuau
CR.Laldingliani
P.C. Lianmawia
C.Laldinthara

Production
Filming began on 20 May 2010 and completed after three months. Major filming took place at Khawnglung Village set created on the top of Darkhuang Hill, Thenzawl, Tui Rihiau, Mat River, Nghasih Valley, Kawmzawl, Zohnuai High School compound and Pukthiang. Although filming was completed early, the processing took almost two years.

Soundtrack
A music video on the original sound track 'Khawnglung Run' was released on 27 May 2012. The song was performed by C.Lalruatkima, music by Kima Chhangte and composed by LT Muana Khiangte.

References

External links 
 

2012 films
Northeast Indian films